The IWC World Heavyweight Championship is a professional wrestling heavyweight championship in the wrestling promotion, International Wrestling Cartel.  The championship was first awarded March 17, 2001 when Powerhouse Hughes defeated Bubba the Bulldog, Guido Corleone, Homicyde, Orion, and Paul Atlas in a six-way elimination match last eliminating Orion.  During Hughes' reign, the title was defended on Championship Wrestling Federation shows as Hughes was the owner of the promotion.

As of March 9, 2022, there are 44 reigns among 28 wrestlers with five vacancies.  The inaugural champion was Powerhouse Hughes.  Dennis Gregory has the most reigns at five.  Shirley Doe has the longest singular reign at 545 days.  Dennis Gregory, RJ City, and DJZ have the shortest singular reign at less than one day.  John McChesney has the longest combined reign at 805 days.

Bill Collier is the current champion in his first reign.  He defeated Elihjah Dean at the 5th Annual Pittsburgh Classic on December 3, 2022.

Title history 

Names

Reigns

|}

Reigns by combined length

Key

Footnotes

References

World
Heavyweight wrestling championships